Touchstone Energy Cooperatives (also called simply Touchstone) is a cooperative federation composed of more than 750 local, consumer-owned utility cooperatives in 46 of the 50 United States of America. Touchstone Energy co-ops serve more than 30 million members.

Touchstone Energy was founded in 1998. Most of its members are also members of the National Rural Electric Cooperative Association. The federation includes both generation and transmission cooperatives and distribution cooperatives. More than 88% of Touchstone Energy's local electric co-ops generate at least a portion of their electricity from renewable resources.

Support of utility cooperatives 
Touchstone Energy provides support to its member cooperatives in various ways.  Among other things, support has included training in strategy development and execution best practices.  Several Touchstone Energy members have subsequently been recognized by the Palladium Hall of Fame for Executing Strategy™ for their success in developing winning strategies and executing on them; these members include Blue Ridge Electric Membership Corp, Powder River Energy Corporation, Ozarks Electric Cooperative, and Roanoke Electric Cooperative.

Philanthropy
Touchstone Energy's North Carolina cooperatives established the Bright Ideas grant program in 1993. The program provides educational grants of up to $3000 for teachers in North Carolina who fund classroom-based projects out of their own pockets.

See also
 National Rural Electric Cooperative Association (NRECA)

References

External links
 

 
Cooperative federations
Organizations established in 1998
Organizations based in Arlington County, Virginia
1998 establishments in Virginia